Koen Casteels (born 25 June 1992) is a Belgian professional footballer who plays as a goalkeeper for Bundesliga club VfL Wolfsburg and the Belgium national team.

Formed at Genk, he spent most of his professional career in Germany with 1899 Hoffenheim, Werder Bremen (loan) and VfL Wolfsburg, making over 100 Bundesliga appearances.

Casteels made 37 appearances for Belgium up to under-21 level. He was first called up for the senior team in 2013 and was part of their squad that came third at the 2018 FIFA World Cup.

Club career
Casteels was developed at K.R.C. Genk where he was a teammate of fellow goalkeeper Thibaut Courtois. He was initially regarded as better than Courtois, but while he and several of the club's other goalkeepers were injured, Courtois broke into the team.

Casteels  was signed by VfL Wolfsburg from TSG 1899 Hoffenheim in January 2015, but spent the first six months of the three-and-a-half-year contract on loan at Werder Bremen. He played for Wolfsburg in the 2015 DFL-Supercup, saving from Xabi Alonso in the penalty shootout as his team won after a 1–1 draw.

When Diego Benaglio left Wolfsburg in June 2017, Casteels signed a new three-year contract with the club and was given the number 1 shirt. He appeared in all of the club's 34 Bundesliga matches during the 2017−18 season.

International career
Casteels was first called up to the senior Belgium team in May 2013. He was going to be part of Belgium's 2014 FIFA World Cup squad but failed to recover from an injury and was replaced by Silvio Proto and then Sammy Bossut.

Manager Roberto Martínez often chose four goalkeepers in his international selections, and as the 2018 FIFA World Cup only permitted three, Casteels battled with Matz Sels for the final space behind Thibaut Courtois and Simon Mignolet. He was eventually chosen for the final 23-man squad to go to Russia.

Casteels made his full international debut on 8 September 2020, in a 5–1 win over Iceland for the UEFA Nations League.

Career statistics

Club

1.Includes DFB-Pokal.
2.Includes UEFA Champions League and UEFA Europa League.
3.Includes DFL-Supercup and Bundesliga relegation play-offs.

International

Honours
VfL Wolfsburg
DFL-Supercup: 2015

Belgium
FIFA World Cup third place: 2018

References

External links

Profile at the VfL Wolfsburg website

1992 births
Living people
Belgian footballers
Association football goalkeepers
People from Bonheiden
K.R.C. Genk players
TSG 1899 Hoffenheim players
SV Werder Bremen players
VfL Wolfsburg players
Bundesliga players
TSG 1899 Hoffenheim II players
Regionalliga players
Belgium youth international footballers
Belgium under-21 international footballers
Belgium international footballers
2018 FIFA World Cup players
2022 FIFA World Cup players
Belgian expatriate footballers
Expatriate footballers in Germany
Belgian expatriate sportspeople in Germany
Footballers from Antwerp Province